U.S. Route 425 (US 425) is a north–south United States highway that travels in the U.S. states of Mississippi, Louisiana, and Arkansas. It was first commissioned in 1989.

The route's northern terminus is in Pine Bluff, Arkansas, at an interchange with Interstate 530/U.S. Route 63/U.S. Route 65/U.S. Route 79/US 65B/AR 190. Until 2005, its southern terminus was in Bastrop, Louisiana, at an intersection with U.S. Route 165. In 2005, it was extended to Natchez, Mississippi, at an intersection with U.S. Route 61.

US 425 is an amalgamation of former state highways. Most of US 425 in Louisiana, for example, is merely a concurrency with Louisiana Highway 15 (LA 15).

Route description
The route number does not follow the numbering convention for U.S. Highways established by the American Association of State Highway and Transportation Officials. The number 425 would normally be used a spur of U.S. Route 25. However, the two routes have never connected.

Mississippi
The southern terminus of US 425 is at a signalized intersection with US 61 and US 84 in Natchez. The route travels northwest through the city concurrent with US 84 to the Natchez–Vidalia Bridge, along which the two routes cross the Mississippi River into Louisiana.

Louisiana
After entering Louisiana, the concurrency with US 84 continues for approximately 14 miles to Ferriday. US 425 then splits and heads northeast, running concurrently with LA 15 through mostly farmland and small towns.  Just north of Clayton is the southern terminus of US 65.  Passing through Winnsboro the highways split at Archibald.  LA 15 continues northwest to Monroe, LA while US 425 heads north to Rayville where it crosses I-20.  At Mer Rouge, it intersects US 165 and the two highways run concurrent to Bastrop, LA. A few miles north of Bastrop, US 425 crosses into Arkansas south of Crossett.

Arkansas

The route enters Arkansas near Rawls and runs north through rural Ashley County. Highway 425 forms a concurrency with US 82 east of Crosett, with the two routes running north through farmland and trees to Hamburg, the county seat of Ashley County. In Hamburg, the routes are joined by Highway 8, which runs east and west across the southern part of the state. North of the junction, the three routes pass the First United Methodist Church and historic properties within the Hamburg Commercial Historic District before US 82 turns east at St. Louis Street and US 425/AR 8 run north out of Hamburg. Passing more agricultural land, Highway 8 turns west in Fountain Hill just before the Drew County line.

Further north US 425 intersects Highway 133 in Lacey and Highway 172 before entering Monticello. The highway serves the University of Arkansas at Monticello in the southern part of town, also passing the Monticello Elementary School. US 425 intersects University Drive and continues north as a four–lane road. There is an interchange with Jordan Drive (AR 83S), after which US 425 enters residential Monticello. The route now curves to the west side of town, with Main Street (AR 83) serving downtown Monticello. Highway 83 was the previous alignment of AR 13, which US 425 replaced upon designation in 1989. There are plans to bypass Monticello even more efficiently as part of Interstate 69's extension into Arkansas.

US 425, now four–lane with center turn lane format, intersects US 278/Highway 35 at a busy intersection. Highway 35 forms a short concurrency north with US 425, which proceeds north and out of Monticello. After AR 35 turns west, Highway 425 has many rural junctions with county routes. Upon entering Lincoln County, the route passes the historic Mt. Zion Presbyterian Church in Relfs Bluff and the Parker House before entering Star City. Downtown, the highway forms a concurrency with Highway 11, which ends near the Lincoln County Courthouse and the Star City Commercial Historic District. The highway continues north through rural areas before intersecting US 65 in Jefferson County. US 65/US 425 run concurrent west to a high–volume interchange with I-530/US 63/US 79/US 65B/AR 190, where US 425 terminates.

History
In Arkansas, US 425 replaced the southern half of Arkansas Highway 13, which was an original state highway in the area. The route is essentially the same as it was at inception in the 1926 state highway plan, connecting the major cities in its area of southeast Arkansas. Highway 13 now runs in north central Arkansas. Most of US Route 425 was repaved in 2010 within Ashley County.

Louisiana Highway 137

Louisiana Highway 137 (LA 137) was a state highway in Louisiana that serves Richland Parish and Morehouse Parish. It spanned  in a south to north direction. LA 137 is now signed as U.S. 425 for its entire length.

From the south, LA 137 began as a state highway at an intersection with LA 15 north of Mangham in the small town of Archibald.  It went north and intersected LA 584 before intersecting LA 135.

Passing under I-20, LA 137 met LA 3048 in the town of Rayville. After intersecting US 80, LA 137 entered Morehouse Parish, continuing north as a two-lane road until it swapped the U.S. 425 designation with LA 133.

LA 137 is a divided, four-lane highway south of Rayville, a pair of two one-way roads inside of Rayville, and an undivided, two-lane road north of Rayville. Before the 1955 renumbering, LA 137 was State Route 47 from Archibald to Rayville. The current routing for LA 137 did not exist, and travelers had to take US 80 west, then State Route 47 (Current LA 133) to Oak Ridge.

LA 137 was removed from the state highway system in 2005, when US 425 was extended south to Mississippi. It is still signed, however, as LA 137 and US 425.

Major intersections

References

External links

Endpoints of U.S. Highway 425

25-4
25-4
25-4
25-4